Elisabeta is a Romanian female name, equivalent to Elizabeth (given name), and may refer to:

Elisabeta Abrudeanu
Elisabeta Anghel
Elisabeta Bǎbeanu
Elisabeta Bostan
Elisabeta Ionescu
Elisabeta Lazăr
Elisabeta Lipă
Elisabeta Movilă
Elisabeta Polihroniade
Elisabeta Rizea
Elisabeta Turcu
Elisabeta Știrbey

Two royal figures are known as Elisabeta in Romanian:

Elisabeth of Wied
Elisabeth of Romania
Elisabeta Palace

Romanian feminine given names